MS Viking may refer to:

 , ferry launched in 1964, called "Viking I" (2007-2008)
 , ferry launched in 1970, called "Viking 1" (1970-1982)
 , ferry launched in 1976, called "Viking 2" (1986-1988)
 
 
 , ferry launched in 1974, called "Viking 5" (1974-1980) and "The Viking" (1981-1983)
 , ferry launched in 1968, called "Viking 6" (1974-1980)
  (All seasons Day Cruising and Commuting), cancelled ship of the 2000s
  (express), ferry launched in 2007
 , ferry launched in 2013
 , ferry launched in 2021

See also
 Empire Viking, several Empire Ships named Viking, see List of Empire ships (U–Z)
 Viking (disambiguation)#Ships

Set index articles on ships
Ship names